Muppets Most Wanted: An Original Walt Disney Records Soundtrack is a soundtrack album released by Walt Disney Records on March 18, 2014, for the musical comedy film Muppets Most Wanted. The soundtrack features six original songs, two re-recordings of popular Muppet songs ("The Muppet Show Theme" and "Together Again"), three cover versions of existing songs (Allen Toussaint's "Working in the Coal Mine", Maroon 5's "Moves Like Jagger", and Los del Río's "Macarena (Bayside Boys Mix)"), an orchestral suite by Christophe Beck, five demos by Bret McKenzie, and eight dialogue tracks.

Songs not included in the album, but featured in the film include "Long Train Runnin'" by The Doobie Brothers, "End of the Road" by Boyz II Men and Marvin Hamlisch's "I Hope I Get It" (from A Chorus Line).

Overview
In November 2012, it was announced that Bret McKenzie would be returning to write songs for Muppets Most Wanted following the success of its 2011 predecessor, The Muppets. As opposed to the previous film, McKenzie wrote all of the original songs for Muppets Most Wanted; his songwriting influences for the film include the Sherman Brothers, Irving Berlin, Paul Williams, and Harry Nilsson. With song ideas originating from short descriptions in the film's screenplay, McKenzie developed numerous songs and performed demo versions of each by doing impressions of various Muppets. "I'm usually just on piano, with me singing and doing my now quite extensive catalog of Muppet impressions," said McKenzie. "I play a rough version then we get together and work out the best. James [Bobin] often has an idea that's visual that he needs to change the lyric to suit the visual and then we record it with the Muppets."

A music video of McKenzie performing "I'll Get You What You Want (Cockatoo in Malibu)" was released on March 19, 2014, on Funny or Die.

Track listing

Personnel
Credits adopted from AllMusic:

Muppet performers
 Steve Whitmire – Kermit the Frog, Beaker, Statler, Rizzo the Rat, Link Hogthrob, Lips, Foo-Foo
 Eric Jacobson – Miss Piggy, Fozzie Bear, Sam Eagle, Animal
 Dave Goelz – The Great Gonzo, Dr. Bunsen Honeydew, Zoot, Waldorf
 Bill Barretta – Rowlf the Dog, Pepé the King Prawn, Dr. Teeth, The Swedish Chef, Carlo Flamingo
 David Rudman – Scooter, Janice, Bobby Benson
 Matt Vogel – Constantine, Floyd Pepper, Lew Zealand, Camilla the Chicken
 Peter Linz – Walter, Manolo Flamingo

Production
Christophe Beck – composer
Bret McKenzie – composer, producer, music supervisor
Tim Davies – conductor
Kaylin Frank – producer
Mitchell Leib – producer, executive in charge of music
James Bobin – executive producer
David Hoberman – executive producer
Todd Lieberman – executive producer
Peter Rotter – orchestra contractor
Jasper Randall – choir contractor

Orchestration
Tim Davies – score coordinator
Dave Metzger – score orchestration
Chris Caswell – orchestration
Zach Robinson – arranger, orchestration
Doug Walter – orchestration
Joanne Kane – music preparation
Booker White – music preparation

Technical
David Bianco – engineer, vocal engineer
Satoshi Noguchi – engineer, mixing
Rick Ruggieri – engineer, mixing
Casey Stone – engineer, mixing
Nick Wollage – engineer, vocal engineer
Francois LaLonde – vocal engineer
Rich Spillberg – vocal engineer
John VanNest – vocal engineer
Mickey Petralia – mixing
Patricia Sullivan – mastering
Richard Ford – score editor
Brett Pierce – music editor
Lisa Jaime – supervising music editor

Art
Steve Gerdes – art direction, design
Steve Sterling – art direction, design

Charts

Muppets Most Wanted: Original Score

Christophe Beck was officially announced to score the film in August 2013. The score was recorded during the latter half of 2013 at the Sony Scoring Stage in Culver City, California. With the use of an 82-piece ensemble of the Hollywood Studio Symphony, Beck drew his inspiration from various cross-cultural styles. "With characters spread across the world," said Beck, "there was opportunity after opportunity to explore many musical styles and settings."

A separate album entirely containing Beck's score was released by Walt Disney Records and Intrada Records on April 15, 2014. The album features music from both Muppets Most Wanted and The Muppets, also scored by Beck.

References

External links
Official album entry at Walt Disney Records

2014 soundtrack albums
Disney film soundtracks
Intrada Records soundtracks
The Muppets albums
Walt Disney Records soundtracks
Musical film soundtracks
Comedy film soundtracks